Stanisław Szymecki (born 26 January 1924) is a Polish prelate of the Roman Catholic Church. At age , he is the oldest living bishop from Poland.

Biography
Szymecki was born in Katowice and was ordained a priest on 3 July 1947. Szymecki was appointed bishop of the Diocese of Kielce on 27 March 1981 and consecrated on 12 April 1981. Szymecki was appointed to the Archdiocese of Białystok on 15 May 1993 and retired from the diocese on 16 November 2000.

See also
Archdiocese of Białystok
Diocese of Kielce

References

External links

Catholic-Hierarchy 
Kielce Diocese (Polish)
Białystok Archdiocese (Polish)

1924 births
Living people
20th-century Roman Catholic archbishops in Poland
Bishops of Białystok
People from Katowice